Alan Taylor (1924 – January 1997) was a television presenter, popular in Wales and the West Country during the 1960s and 1970s.

Taylor was originally from Cardiff, where his family had an electrical business.  He served in the Royal Navy during the Second World War.  He began his television career as a continuity announcer with TWW in 1959. He also appeared in early episodes of "Paint Along With Nancy on HTV where he assisted the host.

After presenting a birthday slot with a glove puppet called "Tinker", he went on to host a regular children's magazine programme called Tinker and Taylor on which he would often play the Melodica with the puppet. In the early 1970s he presented a Saturday morning children's programme on HTV  called Orbit, which featured an alien puppet called "Chester". He later hosted several quiz and game shows on ITV, including Three Little Words and Mr. & Mrs., noted for his distinctive monocle.  He retired in 1982, ran an antique shop in Bath for a time, and then moved to Spain, where he died.

References

External links
  TV Room Plus British TV Announcers

1924 births
1997 deaths
Welsh television presenters
British game show hosts
Mass media people from Cardiff